Novaya Adygea (Pətkəu) is a rural locality (a settlement) in Starobzhegokayskoye Rural Settlement of Takhtamukaysky District, the Republic of Adygea, Russia. The population was 3816 as of 2018. There are 43 streets.

Geography 
Novaya Adygea is located 22 km north of Takhtamukay (the district's administrative centre) by road. Perekatny is the nearest rural locality.

References 

Rural localities in Takhtamukaysky District